Dębowo Lock - the first lock on the Augustów Canal (from the Biebrza) near the village of Dębowo in the administrative district of Gmina Sztabin, within Augustów County, Podlaskie Voivodeship, in north-eastern Poland.

As part of the Augustów Canal the lock was the first waterway (Summit level canal) in Central Europe to provide a direct link between the two major rivers, Vistula River and the Neman River, and it provided a link with the Black Sea to the south through the Oginski Canal, Dnieper River, Berezina Canal and Dvina River. It is currently a conservation protection zone proposed by Poland for inscription onto the World Heritage List of UNESCO.

single-chamber, - concrete brick. From the devastation of war was renovated in 1946, and in the years 1997-2003 were subjected to a thorough renovation. Difference of 3.11 m. The water level lockable wooden door.

Cell dimensions 43.56 x 6.04 m. Hand drive. In the vicinity of the sluice and weir valvular vent used to propel a small hydropower plant. Part of the team locks are buildings from the early twentieth century lock

Location: 0.35 kilometer 
Level difference: 2.07 m
Length: 43.9 m
Width: 6.10 m
Gates: Wood
Years Constructed: 1826-1827
Project manager: Lieutenant. Eng. Michael Przyrembel

References

 
 
 

19th-century establishments in Poland
Dębowo
Augustów County
Buildings and structures in Podlaskie Voivodeship